Boyz is a 2017 Marathi film directed by Vishal Devrukhkar, produced by Lalasaheb Shinde and Rajendra Shinde and presented by the singer Avadhoot Gupte. The film stars Sumant Shinde, Parth Bhalerao, Pratik Lad and Ritika Shrotri in lead roles, and marks the acting debut for Sumant Shinde and Pratik Lad. A sequel named Boyz 2 was released on 5 October 2018.

Plot 
This is a tale of Kabir "Gayatri" Panigrahi, raised by his mother alone. He's tired of facing questions about his father. All the time his mother steers away from the discussion whenever they come to the topic of Kabir's father, which has now developed deep cracks between the two. The only communication thread between them is Kabir's aunt, Radhika. Citing the tense atmosphere at home his mother and aunt decide to send Kabir to a Boarding school.

Two years on, Kabir has settled at the School and has earned every possible success that is achievable. He's striving for success all the time although the questions about the identity of his father still keep haunting him.

Dhairya and Dhungya, two village children get inducted in school as a special case. Both Dhairya and Dhungya are full of mischiefs. Tired of their deeds the villagers have arranged their admission to the boarding school to keep them away. The new entrants start to show their colors and the institute which is based on its principles start to witness changes.

Would the presence of Dhairya & Dhungya affect Kabir? would it be the positive or negative effect? Would Kabir be able to find his answers? Will the broken relation between Kabir and his Mother be mended? Would Dhairya and Dhungya change their ways and initiate responsible beginning? All that forms the crux of the story.

Cast 
 Sumant Shinde as Kabir Gayatri Panigrahi
 Parth Bhalerao as Dhungraj aka "Dhungya" 
 Pratik Lad as Dhairyasheel aka "Dhairya" 
 Ritika Shrotri as Grace
 Santosh Juvekar as Mandar sir
 Shilpa Tulaskar as Gayatri Panigrahi (Kabir's Mother)
 Sharvari Jamenis as Radhika (Kabir's Aunt)
 Zakir Hussain as Fernandez Sir
 Bhalchandra Kadam as Baban
 Vaibhav Mangle as Namya
 Ashvini Mahangade as Teacher
 Sunny Leone as Item number "Kutha kutha jayacha honeymoon la"

Box office 
The film collected  in its first week. and became a surprise blockbuster at the box office.

Sequels
A sequel of the movie Boyz 2 was released on 5 October 2018. The Third installment of the movie Boyz 3 was released on 16 September 2022.

Soundtrack 

The music of the film is composed by Avadhoot Gupte with lyrics by Avadhoot Gupte and Vaibhav Joshi.

Track listing

References

External links 
 

2017 films
2010s Marathi-language films
Indian buddy comedy films
Films set in schools